Conodonts (Greek kōnos, "cone", + odont, "tooth") are an extinct group of agnathan (jawless) vertebrates resembling eels, classified in the class Conodonta. For many years, they were known only from their tooth-like oral elements, which are usually found in isolation and are now called conodont elements. Knowledge about soft tissues remains limited. They existed in the world's oceans for over 300 million years, from the Cambrian to the beginning of the Jurassic. Conodont elements are widely used as index fossils, fossils used to define and identify geological periods. The animals are also called Conodontophora (conodont bearers) to avoid ambiguity.

Discovery and understanding of conodonts
The teeth-like fossils of the conodont were first discovered by Heinz Christian Pander and the results published in Saint Petersburg, Russia, in 1856. The name pander is commonly used in scientific names of conodonts.

It was only in the early 1980s that the first fossil evidence of the rest of the animal was found (see below). In the 1990s exquisite fossils were found in South Africa in which the soft tissue had been converted to clay, preserving even muscle fibres. The presence of muscles for rotating the eyes showed definitively that the animals were primitive vertebrates.

Description

Elements 
Conodont elements consist of mineralised teeth-like structures of varying morphology and complexity. The evolution of mineralized tissues has been puzzling for more than a century. It has been hypothesized that the first mechanism of chordate tissue mineralization began either in the oral skeleton of conodonts or the dermal skeleton of early agnathans.

The element array constituted a feeding apparatus that is radically different from the jaws of modern animals. They are now termed "conodont elements" to avoid confusion. The three forms of teeth, i.e., coniform cones, ramiform bars, and pectiniform platforms, probably performed different functions.

For many years, conodonts were known only from enigmatic tooth-like microfossils (200 micrometers to 5 millimeters in length), which occur commonly, but not always, in isolation and were not associated with any other fossil. Until the early 1980s, conodont teeth had not been found in association with fossils of the host organism, in a konservat lagerstätte. This is because the conodont animal was soft-bodied, thus everything but the teeth was unsuited for preservation under normal circumstances.

These microfossils are made of hydroxylapatite (a phosphatic mineral). The conodont elements can be extracted from rock using adequate solvents.

They are widely used in biostratigraphy. Conodont elements are also used as paleothermometers, a proxy for thermal alteration in the host rock, because under higher temperatures, the phosphate undergoes predictable and permanent color changes, measured with the conodont alteration index. This has made them useful for petroleum exploration where they are known, in rocks dating from the Cambrian to the Late Triassic.

Multielement conodonts 

The conodont apparatus may comprise a number of discrete elements, including the spathognathiform, ozarkodiniform, trichonodelliform, neoprioniodiform, and other forms.

In the 1930s, the concept of conodont assemblages was described by Hermann Schmidt and by Harold W. Scott in 1934.

Elements of ozarkodinids 
The feeding apparatus of ozarkodinids is composed of an axial Sa element at the front, flanked by two groups of four close-set elongate Sb and Sc elements which were inclined obliquely inwards and forwards. Above these elements lay a pair of arched and inward pointing (makellate) M elements. Behind the S-M array lay transversely oriented and bilaterally opposed (pectiniform, i.e. comb-shaped) Pb and Pa elements.

Soft tissues 
Although conodont elements are abundant in the fossil record, fossils preserving soft tissues of conodont animals are known from only a few deposits in the world. One of the first possible body fossils of a conodont were those of Typhloesus, an enigmatic animal known from the Bear Gulch limestone in Montana. This possible identification was based on the presence of conodont elements with the fossils of Typhloesus. This claim was disproved, however, as the conodont elements were actually in the creatures digestive area. That animal is now regarded as a possible mollusk related to gastropods. As of 2022, there are only three described species of conodont animal that have preserved trunks fossils: Clydagnathus windsorensis from the Carboniferous aged Granton Shrimp Bed in Scotland, Promissum pulshrum from the Ordovician aged Soom Shale in South Africa, and Panderodus unicostatus from the Silurian aged Waukesha Biota in Wisconsin. There are other examples of conodont animals that only preserve the head region, including eyes, of the animals known from the Silurian aged Eramosa site in Ontario and Triassic aged Akkamori section in Japan.

According to these fossils, conodonts had large eyes, fins with fin rays, chevron-shaped muscles and axial line, which were interpreted as notochord or the dorsal nerve cord. While Clydagnathus and Panderodus had length only reaching , Promissum is estimated to reach  in length, if it had same proportion as Clydagnathus.

Ecology 

The "teeth" of some conodonts have been interpreted as filter-feeding apparatuses, filtering plankton from the water and passing it down the throat. Others have been interpreted as a "grasping and crushing array". Wear on some condont elements suggests that they functioned like teeth, with both wear marks likely created by food as well as by occlusion with other elements. Studies have concluded that conodonts taxa occupied both pelagic (open ocean) and nektobenthic (swimming above the sediment surface) niches. The preserved musculature suggests that some conodonts (Promissum at least) were efficient cruisers, but incapable of bursts of speed. Based on isotopic evidence, some Devonian conodonts have been proposed to have been low-level consumers that fed on zooplankton.

A study on the population dynamics of Alternognathus has been published. Among other things, it demonstrates that at least this taxon had short lifespans lasting around a month. A study Sr/Ca and Ba/Ca ratios of a population of conodonts from a carbonate platform from the Silurian of Sweden found that the different conodont species and genera likely occupied different trophic niches.

The some species of the genus Panderodus have been speculated to be venomous, based on grooves found on some elements.

Classification and phylogeny 
, scientists classify the conodonts in the phylum Chordata on the basis of their fins with fin rays, chevron-shaped muscles and notochord.

Milsom and Rigby envision them as vertebrates similar in appearance to modern hagfish and lampreys,
and phylogenetic analysis suggests they are more derived than either of these groups.
However, this analysis comes with one caveat: early forms of conodonts, the protoconodonts, appear to form a distinct clade from the later paraconodonts and euconodonts.  Protoconodonts likely represent a stem group to the phylum that includes chaetognath worms; this conclusion suggests that chaetognaths are not close relatives of true conodonts.
Moreover, some analyses do not regard conodonts as either vertebrates or craniates, because they lack the main characteristics of these groups. More recently it has been proposed that conodonts may be stem-cyclostomes, more closely related to hagfish and lampreys than other living vertebrates.

Evolutionary history 
The earliest fossils of conodonts are known from the Cambrian period. Conodonts extensively diversified during the early Ordovician, reaching their apex of diversity during the middle part of the period, and experienced a sharp decline during the late Ordovician and Silurian, before reaching another peak of diversity during the mid-late Devonian. Conodont diversity declined during the Carboniferous, with an extinction event at the end of the middle Tournaisian and a prolonged period of significant loss of diversity during the Pennsylvanian. Only a handful of conodont genera were present during the Permian, though diversity increased after the P-T extinction during the Early Triassic. Diversity continued to decline during the Middle and Late Triassic, culminating in their extinction at the Triassic-Jurassic boundary. Much of their diversity during the Paleozoic was likely controlled by sea levels and temperature, with the major declines during the Late Ordovician and Late Carboniferous due to cooler temperatures, especially glacial events and associated marine regressions which reduced continental shelf area. However, their final demise is more likely related to biotic interactions, perhaps competition with new Mesozoic taxa.

Taxonomy
Conodonta taxonomy based on Sweet & Donoghue, Mikko's Phylogeny Archive and Fish classification 2017.

Conodonta Pander, 1856 non Eichenberg, 1930 sensu Sweet & Donoghue, 2001 [Conodontia; Conodontophorida Eichenberg, 1930; Conodontochordata]
Paraconodonta Müller, 1962 [Paraconodontida]
Amphigeisiniformes
 Amphigeisinidae Miller, 1981
Westergaardodiniformes Lindström, 1970
Westergaardodinidae Müller, 1959 [Chosonodinidae]
Furnishinidae Müller & Nogami, 1971
 Conodontophora Eichenberg, 1930 
Cavidonti Sweet, 1988
 Proconodontiformes Sweet, 1988 
Pseudooneotodidae Wang & Aldridge, 2010
Proconodontidae Lindström, 1981
Cordylodontidae Lindström, 1970 [Cyrtoniodontinae Hass, 1959]
Fryxellodontina
Fryxellodontidae Miller, 1981
Pygodontidae Bergstrom, 1981
Belodellina Sweet, 1988
Ansellidae Faohraeus & Hunter, 1985
Dapsilodontidae Sweet, 1988
Belodellidae Khodalevich & Tschernich, 1973 [Cambropustulidae]
 Conodonti Pander, 1856 non Branson, 1938
Oneotodontidae Miller, 1981 [Teridontidae Miller, 1981] 
Protopanderodontida Sweet, 1988 [Panderodontida]
 ?Pronodontidae Lindström, 1970
 ?Cornuodontidae Faohraeus, 1966
 ?Protopanderodontidae Lindström, 1970 [Juanognathidae Bergström, 1981]
?Strachanognathidae Bergström, 1981
?Pseudooneotodidae
Clavohamulidae Lindström, 1970
Drepanoistodontidae Faohraeus, 1978
Acanthodontidae Lindström, 1970
Scolopodontidae Bergström, 1981
Panderodontidae Lindström, 1970
 Prioniodontida Dzik, 1976 [Distacodontida] (paraphyletic)
 ?Acodontidae Dzik, 1993 [Tripodontinae Sweet, 1988]
?Cahabagnathidae Stouge & Bagnoli 1999
?Distacodontidae Bassler, 1925 emend. Ulrich & Bassler, 1926 [Drepanodontinae Fahraeus & Nowlan, 1978; Lonchodininae Hass, 1959]
?Gamachignathidae Wang & Aldridge, 2010
?Jablonnodontidae Dzik, 2006
?Nurrellidae Pomešano-Cherchi, 1967
 ?Paracordylodontidae Bergström, 1981
?Playfordiidae Dzik, 2002
?Ulrichodinidae Bergström, 1981
Rossodus Repetski & Ethington, 1983
Multioistodontidae Harris, 1964 [Dischidognathidae]
Oistodontidae Lindström, 1970
Periodontidae Lindström, 1970
Rhipidognathidae Lindström, 1970 sensu Sweet, 1988
Prioniodontidae Bassler, 1925
Phragmodontidae Bergström, 1981
Plectodinidae Sweet, 1988
Icriodontacea
 Balognathidae (Hass, 1959)
 Polyplacognathidae Bergström, 1981
 Distomodontidae Klapper, 1981
 Icriodellidae Sweet, 1988
 Icriodontidae Müller & Müller, 1957
Prioniodinida Sweet, 1988
 ?Oepikodontidae Bergström, 1981
?Xaniognathidae Sweet, 1981
Chirognathidae Branson & Mehl, 1944
Prioniodinidae Bassler, 1925 [Hibbardellidae Mueller, 1956]
Bactrognathidae Lindström, 1970
Ellisoniidae Clark, 1972
Gondolellidae Lindström, 1970
Ozarkodinida Dzik, 1976 [Polygnathida]
 ?Anchignathodontidae Clark, 1972
?Archeognathidae Miller, 1969
?Belodontidae Huddle, 1934
?Coleodontidae Branson & Mehl, 1944 [Hibbardellidae Müller, 1956; Loxodontidae]
?Eognathodontidae Bardashev, Weddige & Ziegler, 2002
?Francodinidae Dzik, 2006
?Gladigondolellidae (Hirsch, 1994) [Sephardiellinae Plasencia, Hirsch & Márquez-Aliaga, 2007; Neogondolellinae Hirsch, 1994; Cornudininae Orchard, 2005; Epigondolellinae Orchard, 2005; Marquezellinae Plasencia et al., 2018; Paragondolellinae Orchard, 2005; Pseudofurnishiidae Ramovs, 1977]
?Iowagnathidae Liu et al., 2017
?Novispathodontidae (Orchard, 2005)
?Trucherognathidae Branson & Mehl, 1944
?Vjalovognathidae Shen, Yuan & Henderson, 2015
?Wapitiodontidae Orchard, 2005
Cryptotaxidae Klapper & Philip, 1971
Spathognathodontidae Hass, 1959 [Ozarkodinidae Dzik, 1976]
Pterospathodontidae Cooper, 1977 [Carniodontidae] 
Kockelellidae Klapper, 1981 [Caenodontontidae]
Polygnathidae Bassler, 1925 [?Eopolygnathidae Bardashev, Weddige & Ziegler, 2002]
Palmatolepidae Sweet, 1988
Hindeodontidae (Hass, 1959)
Elictognathidae Austin & Rhodes, 1981
Gnathodontidae Sweet, 1988
Idiognathodontidae Harris & Hollingsworth, 1933
Mestognathidae Austin & Rhodes, 1981
Cavusgnathidae Austin & Rhodes, 1981
Sweetognathidae Ritter, 1986

See also

 Timeline of the evolutionary history of life
 Micropaleontology
 List of conodont genera
 Conodont biostratigraphy
 Conodont alteration index

References

Further reading
 

 
 Gould, Stephen Jay (1985). "Reducing Riddles". In The Flamingo's Smile, 245-260. New York, W.W. Norton and Company.  .
 
Knell, Simon J. The Great Fossil Enigma: The Search for the Conodont Animal (Indiana University Press; 2012) 440 pages
 Sweet, Walter (1988). The Conodonta: morphology, taxonomy, paleoecology, and evolutionary history of a long-extinct animal phylum. Oxford, Clarendon Press.

External links 
 
  

 
Furongian first appearances
Late Triassic extinctions
Cambrian chordates